Tasia Seumanufagai (born 15 September 1989) is a New Zealand rugby league footballer who plays for the Wests Tigers in the NSWRL Women's Premiership. 

Background
Seumanufagai was born in Auckland and raised in Wellington. Her cousin, Ava, is a professional rugby league player.

Playing career
In 2010, Seumanufagai began playing rugby league for the Randwick Kingfishers. She later moved to Melbourne, where she began playing rugby union before playing rugby league for the Truganina Rabbitohs.

In 2011, she made her Test debut for Samoa against Australia in Apia.

In May 2019, she represented the Combined Affiliated States at the Women's National Championships. In June 2019, she was named in Samoa's squad for their Test against New Zealand but did not play.

On 10 July 2019, she joined the New Zealand Warriors NRL Women's Premiership team. In Round 3 of the 2019 NRL Women's season, she made her debut for the Warriors in a 10–8 win over the Brisbane Broncos.

In 2020, Seumanufagai played for the Wests Tigers in the NSWRL Women's Premiership.

References

External links
NRL profile

1989 births
Living people
New Zealand sportspeople of Samoan descent
New Zealand female rugby league players
Samoan rugby league players
Rugby league locks
New Zealand Warriors (NRLW) players